The Eastern Zone was one of the three regional zones of the 1980 Davis Cup.

10 teams entered the Eastern Zone, with 6 teams competing in the preliminary round to join the previous year's semifinalists in the main draw. Japan and India received byes into the quarterfinals, while Australia and New Zealand received byes into the semifinals. The winner of the main draw went on to compete in the Inter-Zonal Zone against the winners of the Americas Zone and Europe Zone.

Australia defeated New Zealand in the final and progressed to the Inter-Zonal Zone.

Preliminary rounds

Draw

First round
South Korea vs. Pakistan

Qualifying round
Chinese Taipei vs. Thailand

South Korea vs. Indonesia

Main draw

Draw

Quarterfinals
Chinese Taipei vs. Japan

South Korea vs. India

Semifinals
Australia vs. Japan

New Zealand vs. South Korea

Final
Australia vs. New Zealand

References

External links
Davis Cup official website

Davis Cup Asia/Oceania Zone
Eastern Zone
Davis Cup
Davis Cup
Davis Cup
Davis Cup